Ahalya is a 1978 Indian Malayalam film,  directed by Babu Nanthankode. The film stars Sheela, Prathapachandran, Aranmula Ponnamma and Balan K. Nair in the lead roles. The film has musical score by KJ Joy.

Cast
Sheela
Prathapachandran
Aranmula Ponnamma
Balan K. Nair
Latha
Nagaraj

Soundtrack
The music was composed by K. J. Joy and the lyrics were written by Bichu Thirumala.

References

External links
 

1978 films
1970s Malayalam-language films
Films scored by K. J. Joy